Stigmella argentifasciella is a moth of the family Nepticulidae. It is found in Ohio, Kentucky and Illinois.

There are two or possibly three generations per year. Full-grown larvae have been collected in June, August and September.

The larvae feed on Tilia americana. They mine the leaves of their host plant. At first, the mine is within the parenchyma of the leaf and barely visible on the upper surface. Later it broadens into a blotch or broad tract and becomes transparent. The frass is deposited in sinuous curves.

External links

A taxonomic revision of the North American species of Stigmella (Lepidoptera: Nepticulidae)

Nepticulidae
Moths described in 1912
Endemic fauna of the United States
Moths of North America